Gzinka  is a village in the administrative district of Gmina Łyszkowice, within Łowicz County, Łódź Voivodeship, in central Poland.

Massacre during Second World War

During the German Invasion of Poland in 1939, German forces on 30 September murdered 11 people in the village. .

References 

 Central Statistical Office (GUS) Population: Size and Structure by Administrative Division - (2007-12-31) (in Polish)

Massacres in Poland
Germany–Poland relations
Nazi war crimes in Poland
Villages in Łowicz County